Hemerophanes is a genus of moths in the subfamily Lymantriinae. The genus was erected by Cyril Leslie Collenette in 1953.

Species
Hemerophanes diatoma (Hering, 1926)
Hemerophanes enos (H. Druce, 1896) southern Nigeria, western Africa
Hemerophanes hypoxantha (Holland, 1893) western Africa
Hemerophanes larvata (Schultze, 1934) north-western Congo
Hemerophanes libyra (H. Druce, 1896) southern and eastern Africa
Hemerophanes litigiosa (Hering, 1926) Tanzania

References

Lymantriinae